Noah Smith (born 15 December 2000) is an Australian professional association football player who plays as a left-back for Brisbane Roar in the A-League Men. He has previously played for Adelaide United, Central Coast Mariners, and Melbourne Victory.

Club career

Adelaide United
In October 2020, Smith signed a one-year scholarship deal with Adelaide United. In June 2021, he was released by Adelaide United.

Central Coast Mariners
A month after leaving Adelaide United, Smith joined Central Coast Mariners for the 2021–22 A-League Men season. He made his debut for the Mariners against APIA Leichhardt on 21 December 2021 in the FFA Cup, scoring the final goal in a 6–0 win. Smith departed the Mariners after one season, making 11 appearances in all competitions.

Melbourne Victory
On 10 June 2022, Melbourne Victory announced the signing of Noah Smith. Smith made 7 appearances for the Victory, before departing the club on a free transfer midway through his first season at the club.

Brisbane Roar
In February 2023, upon departing Melbourne Victory, Smith joined Brisbane Roar on a 1.5 year contract. Smith made his debut for the Roar against his former club, Central Coast Mariners, on 10 February 2023.

References

External links

2000 births
Living people
Australian soccer players
Association football defenders
Adelaide United FC players
Central Coast Mariners FC players
Melbourne Victory FC players
Brisbane Roar FC players
National Premier Leagues players
A-League Men players